George "Heber" Quinton (2 November 1883 – 25 April 1907) was an Australian rules footballer who played with Geelong in the Victorian Football League (VFL).

Notes

External links 

1883 births
1907 deaths
Australian rules footballers from Victoria (Australia)
Geelong Football Club players
People educated at Geelong College